Theunis Jacobus van Schalkwyk (14 September 1929 – 27 August 2005) was a boxer from South Africa, silver medalist at the 1952 Summer Olympics in Helsinki.

He was born in Krugersdorp, Gauteng.

References

External links

1929 births
2005 deaths
Middleweight boxers
Afrikaner people
People from Krugersdorp
Olympic boxers of South Africa
Boxers at the 1952 Summer Olympics
Olympic silver medalists for South Africa
Medalists at the 1952 Summer Olympics
Boxers at the 1950 British Empire Games
Commonwealth Games gold medallists for South Africa
Olympic medalists in boxing
South African male boxers
Commonwealth Games medallists in boxing
Sportspeople from Gauteng
Medallists at the 1950 British Empire Games